Geivar Hasado Shlaimon, best known as A36 (born 11 May 1995 in Flen) is a Swedish rapper. On 9 April 2021, A36 released the song "Samma gamla vanliga" whiched peaked at number one on the Swedish Sverigetopplistan. In August 2022, A36 performed his song on Allsång på Skansen broadcast on SVT. He lives in Partille.

He was named "Newcomer of the Year" by the magazine Kingsize in 2020.

Discography

Singles

References

1995 births
Swedish rappers
Living people